Metaliferi Mountains, meaning Ore Mountains, are in the Carpathian Mountain Range and are a division of the Apuseni Mountains.

Peaks
The range also includes the Detunatele, a pair of basalt peaks with columnar jointing which are two of the most beautiful peaks in the Apuseni Mountains. The Roșia Poieni copper mine and several communities are in the area.

Lakes
There are several lakes nestled within the Metaliferi Mountains. Five of them are located near Roșia Montană:

See also
 Divisions of the Carpathians
 List of lakes of Romania

References

Further reading
Evolution of the lito-genetic processes (Evoluția proceselor litogenetice), in The Geological Evolution of the Metaliferic Mountains (Evoluția geologică a Munților Metaliferi"), Editura Academiei, (in collaboration with M. Lupu), 1969

Mountains of Romania
Mountain ranges of the Western Romanian Carpathians